This is a chronological list of WXW Cruiserweight Champions. The WXW Cruiserweight Championship is a professional wrestling title created in 1996 as part of Top Rope Productions and World Xtreme Wrestling when the promotion was renamed in 1998.

Title history

Names

Reigns

List of combined reigns 

Key

References

External links
Top Rope Productions Title Histories

World Xtreme Wrestling championships
Cruiserweight wrestling championships